Lloyd Mondory (born 26 April 1982) is a French restaurateur and former professional road bicycle racer, who rode professionally between 2004 and 2015 for the  team before he was suspended for four years for the use of erythropoietin (EPO). The biggest results of his career included victory in the 2008 Grand Prix of Aargau Canton, stage wins in the Étoile de Bessèges, the Vuelta a Burgos and the Paris–Corrèze and second place in a stage of the 2008 Vuelta a España.

In March 2015, it was announced that Mondory had tested positive for erythropoietin (EPO) in an out-of-competition test taken on 17 February. On 30 October 2015, the UCI announced that Mondory was suspended until 9 March 2019. Mondory did not return to cycling after his ban finished, electing to focus on his restaurant Oncle Scott's in Carentan, which opened in 2016.

Major results

2000
 8th Road race, UCI Junior Road World Championships
2002
 3rd Classic Loire Atlantique
 4th Overall Tour du Loir-et-Cher
1st Stage 2
2003
 1st Overall Kreiz Breizh Elites
 1st Stage 1 Tour du Loir-et-Cher
 3rd Road race, National Under-23 Road Championships
2005
 1st Stage 3 Vuelta a Castilla y León
 3rd Grand Prix de Denain
 5th Overall Tour de Picardie
 6th Overall Boucles de la Mayenne
 6th Tour de Vendée
 8th Ronde van Midden-Zeeland
 10th Tartu GP
2006
 1st French Road Cycling Cup
 3rd Dwars door Vlaanderen
 4th Cholet-Pays de Loire
 4th Tro-Bro Léon
 4th Tour de Vendée
 5th Grand Prix de Denain
 7th Grand Prix de Villers-Cotterêts
 7th Grand Prix de la ville de Rennes
 8th Trofeo Alcudia
 10th Polynormande
2007
 5th Tro-Bro Léon
 7th Châteauroux Classic
 8th Le Samyn
2008
 1st GP Kantons Aargau
 1st Mountains classification Tirreno–Adriatico
 1st Stage 2 Paris–Corrèze
 6th Polynormande
2009
 5th Route Adélie
 6th Overall Circuit Franco-Belge
 9th Polynormande
2010
 3rd Tro-Bro Léon
 4th Route Adélie
 4th Polynormande
 6th Memorial Rik Van Steenbergen
 9th Le Samyn
 9th Scheldeprijs
2011
 1st Stage 2 Étoile de Bessèges
 2nd Grand Prix de la Somme
 5th Gent–Wevelgem
 6th Memorial Samyn
 7th Overall Paris–Corrèze
 8th GP Kanton Aargau Gippingen
2012
 5th Overall Tour de Wallonie
 5th Tour du Finistère
 6th Tro-Bro Léon
 6th Boucles de l'Aulne
 7th Omloop Het Nieuwsblad
 9th Dwars door Vlaanderen
2013
 8th Paris–Bourges
2014
 1st Stage 4 Vuelta a Burgos
 8th Overall Tour de Wallonie
2015
 7th Clásica de Almería

Grand Tour general classification results timeline

References

External links 

 
 
 
 Profile at AG2R Prévoyance official website
 

1982 births
Living people
People from Cognac, France
French male cyclists
Doping cases in cycling
French sportspeople in doping cases
Sportspeople from Charente
French restaurateurs
Cyclists from Nouvelle-Aquitaine